Linxiao Road Subdistrict is a subdistrict in northwestern Daxing District, Beijing, China. It borders Xingfeng Subdistrict to its north, Guanyinsi Subdistrict to its east, Tiangongyuan Subdistrict to its south, as well as Beizangcun and Huangcun Towns to its west. In 2020, it was home to 81,389 residents.

The subdistrict was named after Linxiao Road, which in turn gets into name from the State Academy of Forest Administration.

History

Administrative divisions 

In the year 2021, Linxiao Road Subdistrict was formed by the following 23 communities:

Gallery

See also 

 List of township-level divisions of Beijing

References 

Daxing District
Subdistricts of Beijing